The Great Eastern Railway was formed on 1 August 1862, when the Eastern Counties Railway changed its name.

Robert Sinclair (1856–1866)

Samuel Waite Johnson (1866–1873)

William Adams (1873–1878)

Massey Bromley (1878–1881)

Thomas William Worsdell (1882–1885)

James Holden (1885–1907)

Stephen Dewar Holden (1908–1912)

Alfred John Hill (1912–1922)

Locomotives built to GER designs after 1922

Preserved locomotives

External links

Locomotives of the LNER

References

 
!Great Eastern Railway
British railway-related lists
Great Eastern Railway
Great Eastern Railway
Great Eastern Railway